Köprübaşı Dam is an embankment dam on the Bolu River Zonguldak Province, Turkey. The development was backed by the Turkish State Hydraulic Works.

See also

List of dams and reservoirs in Turkey

External links
DSI, State Hydraulic Works (Turkey), Retrieved December 16, 2009

Dams in Zonguldak Province
Hydroelectric power stations in Turkey
Dams completed in 2009